Gelrebia is a genus of flowering plants in the family Fabaceae. It belongs to the subfamily Caesalpinioideae.

Species
Gelrebia comprises the following species:
 Gelrebia bracteata (Germish. 1991) E. Gagnon & G. P. Lewis 2016
 Gelrebia dauensis (Thulin 1980) E. Gagnon & G. P. Lewis 2016
 Gelrebia glandulosopedicellata (R. Wilczek 1951) E. Gagnon & G. P. Lewis 2016
 Gelrebia merxmuellerana (A.Schreib. 1980) E. Gagnon & G. P. Lewis 2016 (Namibia)
 Gelrebia oligophylla (Harms 1902) E. Gagnon & G. P. Lewis 2016
 Gelrebia rostrata (N.E.Br. 1901) E. Gagnon & G. P. Lewis 2016
 Gelrebia rubra (Engl. 1889) E. Gagnon & G. P. Lewis 2016
 Gelrebia trothae (Harms 1899) E. Gagnon & G. P. Lewis 2016
 subsp. erlangeri (Harms 1902) E. Gagnon & G. P. Lewis 2016
 subsp. trothae (Harms 1899) E. Gagnon & G. P. Lewis 2016

References

External links 

Caesalpinieae
Fabaceae genera